The  series is a line of budget-priced video games published by Japanese company D3 Publisher, a subsidiary of Bandai Namco Entertainment. Games in the series have been developed by several different companies, including Sandlot, Success, Irem, and Taito. It was introduced in 1998 for the PlayStation, and has been released for platforms such as the PlayStation 2, Nintendo DS, and mobile phones. The number in a series name indicates the price point of the games in the series; for instance, a "Simple 2000" series game would cost 2000 yen.

Early Simple games were generic interpretations of other common video game themes, including tennis, racing, and video board games such as mahjong. Beginning with the PlayStation 2, Simple games began using larger genres such as scrolling shooters and role-playing games, in addition to original ideas and concepts. As the games were sold at a low price point and required little development time, developers were able to experiment with gameplay concepts and mechanics. A few entries in the series were released outside Japan by other companies without the brand. After releasing two Simple games for the Nintendo 3DS in 2013, D3 has chosen to remove the Simple name from its budget titles for systems such as the Nintendo Switch and PlayStation 4, though plans to release another entry has been announced for the Switch. In 2022, D3Publisher announced that the Simple Series brand will return for the Nintendo Switch.

The Simple series and several of its games, including Demolition Girl, The Maid Clothes and Machine Gun, Onechanbara and the Earth Defense Force series, have garnered notoriety outside Japan for their usually outlandish and bizarre nature. Publications have identified the series as being of considerably better quality than similar budget title ranges, with gameplay ideas they consider unique and interesting. As of 2007, the Simple series has sold over 20 million units across all platforms.

Development
D3 Publisher employs a number of external developers for the series, some of the most prolific being Tamsoft (of Battle Arena Toshinden fame) and HuneX - most are smaller or little-known companies, although several games have been licensed from Taito for a (usually enhanced) re-release.

Certain Simple series titles have attracted considerable interest outside Japan for various reasons, either gameplay quality or a particularly unique idea - these include The OneeChanbara and its sequels, as well as Sandlot's Monster Attack and Global Defence Force, which were based on their Gigantic Drive engine and were of considerably higher quality than most games in the series. Both of these series have had sequels for the Microsoft Xbox 360 video game console, although they were originally labelled under an "X" moniker (OneChanbara X and Earth Defense Force X) rather than a "Simple" one.

Many of the PlayStation 2 Simple 2000 games have been released in PAL regions as budget titles by Midas Interactive Entertainment, Agetec or 505 GameStreet, usually under different titles and with new cover art; recently D3 Publisher of Europe has released several titles itself under the "Essential Games" brand. Additionally, several of the PlayStation Simple 1500 games were released in the US (by Agetec) and Europe (by Midas and Phoenix Games). Despite the recent establishment of D3 Publisher of America, the only games in the Simple series to gain a North American release are The Bass Fishing (as Fisherman's Bass Club), The Genshijin (as The Adventures of Darwin) and OneChanbara for the Xbox 360 and Wii. Simple Series for Wii U Vol.1: The Family Party was released internationally as Family Party: 30 Great Games Obstacle Arcade.

See also
Success, another Japanese publisher whose SuperLite series is very similar to D3's Simple series.
Sega Ages, a Sega franchise which the Sega Ages 2500 series is also very similar to this series.

Notes

References

External links
 D3 Publisher

 
Bandai Namco Entertainment franchises
Video game franchises
Video game franchises introduced in 1998
Video games developed in Japan